Rafet Yaşdut (born 25 August 1968), better known by his stage name Rafet El Roman, is a Turkish pop singer of Romani heritage. He holds German citizenship.

Biography
When El Roman's parents moved to Germany in 1970, he lived with his grandmother until he was 7 years old at Uzunköprü. After he finished first grade at primary school in the village, he was sent to his parents in Germany. He completed his education in Germany.  He speaks German, English, Italian and Turkish.  He started writing his first lyrics at 16 years old.

In 1984 he contacted Stefan Somogyfoki from Midnight Entertainment and in 1987 he played the leading role in the fantasy movie Defender. At this time he learned a lot about film making and acting. Also, he started to co-direct his own fighting scenes in movies. Everyone could see his talent for acting and the art of making movies. At this time he started to write his first songs "Benimlen" and "Seni Seviyorum".

He gave his first stage performances in 1988. In 1992, he was voted "Best of the Year" by Saarlaendischer Rundfunk Radio. In 1994, he was awarded with Media Artist Award in Frankfurt Cultural Festival. In August 1995, he returned to Turkey and released his first solo album. The album Gençliğin Gözyaşı (The Tears of the Youth) sold over one million having hits like "Sorma Neden", "Seni Seviyorum" and "Amerika". In October 1997, he released his second album En Güzel Günler Senin Olsun (Have The Most Beautiful Days). In 1998, he released his first solo album in Europe. In 1998, he played in the film Propaganda with major stars of the Turkish cinema history such as Kemal Sunal and Metin Akpınar.

In May 1999, he had a huge success with his third album Hayat Hüzünlü (Sorrowful Life).
In 2000, Rafet El Roman vocalized the song Bir Gol Daha (One More Goal) with Mehmet Ali Erbil for the Turkey national football team's Euro 2000 campaign.
In 2000, he was the principal actor in the cinema film Offside (Dar Alanda Kısa Paslaşmalar) with co-star Müjde Ar. In 2001, with his own lyrics and song, he sang a duet with Aşkın Nur Yengi titled "Peşindeyim" (I Am in the Pursue of You).

He released the fourth album Hanimeli (Lonicera) in January 2001 and his fifth album 5 Nr. Aşk (Love Nr. 5) in April 2002.
He released his 6th album, Sürgün (Exile), in the summer of 2004 and this album sold the best. The album had been one of the favorite albums of 2004 with many hit songs. In summer 2005, he released the seventh album Kalbimin Sultanı (The Sultan of My Heart) in honour of his 10th Year. The album became the top seller after initial release. He received the MÜ-YAP "Golden Butterfly", POPSAV "The Most Successful Pop Singer of the Year" awards. In summer 2006, he released the album Gönül Yarası (Heart Pain).

Rafet El Roman aims to introduce new names to the music market with his music production company "RER" established in 2000. Also, it is among the greatest desires of Rafet El Roman to be a scenarist and director of his own film.

Personal life
He has two daughters with former wife, beauty contest winner . The couple divorced in 2003. They received wide interest in the media with the custody battle over their daughters. He also has a son with his former partner Yeşim Eryıldız. In 2014, he married his second wife Ceren Kaplakarslan in Germany. The two got divorced in August 2017.

Discography

Albums

Singles
 2000 - Peşindeyim (feat. Aşkın Nur Yengi)
 2012 - Senden Sonra
 2014 - Adımla Seslendi
 2015 - Şipşak
 2016 - Suç Bende mi
 2016 - Teşekkürler Türkiyem
 2017 - Sen Olmazsan (feat. Hülya Avşar)
 2018 - Özledim
 2018 - Unuturum Elbet (feat. Derya)
 2019 - Bağışla Beni (feat. Faridam)
 2019 - Bahçede Yeşil Çınar (feat. Ayşe Nur Keskin)
 2019 - Anlamazdın (Fikret Şeneş Şarkıları) (2019)
 2019 - Seveni Suçlama
 2020 - Paramparça (feat. Burak King)
 2020 - Öldüğün Gün İnanırsın (Kitaplara İnanmayan)
 2021 - İki Dakika (feat. Nur Usta)
 2021 - Bağışla Beni
 2021 - Şubat (feat. Ayten)
 2022 - Milyon Yara

Filmography 
 1999 – Propaganda (Adem) (1999)
 2000 – Dar Alanda Kısa Paslaşmalar (Serkan) (2000)
 2002 – Asayiş Berkemal (Berkemal) (2002)
 2007 – Senin Uğruna (Kemal) (2007)

References

External links

1968 births
Living people
Turkish pop musicians
People from Havsa
Turkish Romani people
German people of Turkish descent